Mr. Bean: The Animated Series (simply known as Mr. Bean) is a British animated sitcom produced by Tiger Aspect Productions in association with Richard Purdum Productions and Varga Holdings (for the first three series). Based on the 1990–1995 British live-action television sitcom of the same title created by Rowan Atkinson and Richard Curtis, the series centres on Mr. Bean (voiced by Atkinson), Teddy, Irma Gobb and the Reliant Regal's mysterious driver, with the addition of new characters such as Bean's landlady Mrs. Wicket and her cat Scrapper. In February 2001, the series was officially announced.

Debuting on 5 January 2002 and originally ending on 2 June 2004, the first three series featuring 52 episodes in total was broadcast, each consisting of two 11-minute segments. The first two series were originally broadcast on ITV1 at a prime time Saturday night slot. In May 2004, the series left the Saturday night prime time timeslot on ITV1 following the broadcast of the first two series and the third series was instead broadcast daily on CITV, due to the show's popularity with younger audiences.

In January 2014, a revival of the series was announced, with Rowan Atkinson returning as the voice of Mr. Bean, along with other cast members reprising their roles. The revival featured two new series and 78 episodes; it premiered on 16 February 2015 and ended on 8 October 2019 on CITV. The revival contained more actual dialogue than in the original series, which mostly featured little sound effects and mumbling.

Characters

Main

 Mr. Bean (voiced by Rowan Atkinson) – The series' title character and main protagonist, a childish, self-absorbed and extremely competitive individual living in London who is almost always dressed in his trademark tweed jacket and a thin red tie, and often brings various abnormal schemes and contrivances to everyday tasks like his live-action counterpart. Despite this, he is depicted in the animated series as more competent and less buffoonish than his live-action counterpart as well as that he talks more in complete sentences compared to his live-action counterpart, who rarely spoke a few mumbled words that are all in a comically low-pitched voice (especially in the later series).
 Teddy – Mr. Bean's teddy bear and lifelong best friend. Despite being inanimate, Bean pretends that Teddy is alive like in the original live action series.
 Mrs. Julia Wicket (voiced by Sally Grace) – Mr. Bean's elderly and grouchy landlady who often despises Bean and his antics, though deep down, she does have a soft spot for him (which becomes more prominent in the later series). As a running gag, she screams out loud during bad situations, which often scares birds outside the flat. As depicted in the episode "Young Bean", the reason why she hates Bean so much is because in the past, a young Bean accidentally ruined her wedding by riding his go-kart down a hill and crashing into her and her groom. In the three Seasons, she is playing an antagonistic and villainous role of each episodes.
 Scrapper – Mrs. Wicket's mischievous evil one-eyed pet cat who despises Mr. Bean, much like his owner.
 Irma Gobb (voiced by Matilda Ziegler) – Mr. Bean's long-suffering girlfriend who debuted in the original live-action series episode "The Curse of Mr. Bean". Like her original live-action counterpart, Irma is depicted as more intelligent and significantly less buffoonish than Bean, which often results in her having an often-strained relationship with the latter. She is also depicted in the series as a worker at a local library.
 Miss Mary Wince – Mrs. Wicket's best friend, who often stops by her flat for tea and watches wrestling with her. She is called Mary in the episode "A Royal Makeover".
 Mr. Bean's Mini – Mr. Bean's vehicle, a citron-green Mini with a matte black bonnet. As a running gag, Bean keeps it locked with a bolt-latch and padlock rather than the lock fitted to the car like in the original live action series. Unlike in the live action series where the Mini's registration number is "SLW 287R", the registration number in the animated series is "STE 952R".
 Reliant Regal –  A light-blue and three-wheeled car which, as another running gag, is always getting turned over or crashed out of its parking space or into anywhere by Mr. Bean in his Mini, who is usually oblivious to the results like in the original live action series. Unlike in the live action series where the Reliant's registration number is "GRA 26K", the registration number in the animated series is "DUW 742".

Supporting 
 Burglars – A duo of criminals (one stocky and the other small) who are masters of disguises and regularly go across London committing various crimes, but nevertheless suffer defeat at the hands of Mr. Bean (mainly at times when Bean is their victim or witness), who then has the local police arrest them.
 Bruiser family – Mr. Bean and Mrs. Wicket's next-door neighbours, a working class overweight family who sometimes act as Bean's adversaries. While appearing as a whole family in the episodes "Neighbourly Bean", "Scaredy Bean", "Home Movie", "Litterbugs", "Super Spy" and "Dig This", the Bruisers appear as father and son in most episodes.
 Queen Elizabeth II – The queen regnant of the United Kingdom and the Commonwealth, of whom Mr. Bean is a fan.
 Traffic Warden – An unnamed parking enforcement officer who previously appeared on the original live action series episode "The Trouble with Mr. Bean". As the name of her job implies, she locates and tickets illegally-parked cars across London. As Mr. Bean habitually parks his Mini in the wrong places, she promptly gets in his way which puts him at odds with her. She is very committed at her duty, even to the point of ticketing a police vehicle once.
 Librarian – The boss of the library where Irma works, who is seen from Series 2 onwards.
 Lottie – Irma Gobb's teddy bear who looks identical to Teddy, except she has eyelashes, a red bow and a skirt. She is portrayed as Teddy's girlfriend, but Mr. Bean disapproves of this relationship (with the exception of the episode "Double Trouble").
 Mrs. Wicket's nephew - The unnamed nephew of Mrs. Wicket who debuted in Series 5. He is usually seen playing video games at his aunt's flat.
 Declan – A friend of Irma Gobb who debuted in Series 5. He is also a rival of Mr. Bean when it comes to winning her heart.

Voice cast 
Rowan Atkinson as Mr. Bean
Sally Grace as Mrs. Julia Wicket
Matilda Ziegler as Irma Gobb

Episodes

Reception 
The show was met with mostly positive reviews from television critics. Common Sense Media, an education and advocacy group that promotes safe technology and media for children, gave the show 3 stars and wrote that the "UK slapstick cartoon [is] geared toward older kids, adults."

Home media
Mr. Bean: The Animated Series has been released on DVD by A&E Home Video in Region 1, and by Universal Pictures Home Entertainment in Regions 2 and 4. In the United States, the first three series of the series were released entirely on six volumes while in the United Kingdom and Australia, the six volumes only contained 47 out of all the 52 episodes, to which  3 episodes appeared as extra features on DVDs of the original live action series.

The reason for this was that when the five episodes were classified by the British Board of Film Classification in the United Kingdom, they were each given a PG certificate instead of a U certificate unlike the other episodes. It was then decided that all DVDs of the series should have a U certificate each, resulting in the five PG-rated episodes not being included.

In Region 4, the DVD Mr. Bean: The Animated Series: Season 2, Volume 3 – Racing Adventures was an exclusive product for Big W; nowadays, it is no longer available.

In other media
A third-person platform video game based on the series was released in the late 2000s on multiple platforms.  It was first released in PAL regions as Mr. Bean on the PlayStation 2, Nintendo DS, and Microsoft Windows.  A Wii port of the game, titled Mr. Bean's Wacky World, was also released shortly after those versions in the same regions, with a North American localisation of the port being available in 2011.

Multiple apps based on the series have been released such as Mr. Bean: Around the World, Mr. Bean: Flying Teddy, Mr. Bean: Sandwich Stack, and Mr. Bean: Special Delivery, which are available globally on iOS, Android, and Amazon mobile devices.

References

External links
 
 

Mr. Bean
2000s British animated television series
2010s British animated television series
2000s British animated comedy television series
2010s British animated comedy television series
2000s British sitcoms
2010s British sitcoms
2002 British television series debuts
2019 British television series endings
Animation based on real people
British children's animated comedy television series
British adult animated comedy television series
English-language television shows
British television series revived after cancellation
Television series created by Rowan Atkinson
Television series created by Richard Curtis
Television series by Tiger Aspect Productions
Television series by Endemol
Television series by Fremantle (company)
Television shows set in London
Television shows adapted into video games